The Finnish League Cup was a knock-out football competition contested annually during the pre-season in winter by teams from Veikkausliiga. The league cup was abolished after the 2016 tournament and replaced with the Finnish Cup group stage starting from the 2017 season. League cup will be played again in spring of 2022.

The competition is notably the only football competition in Europe which is mostly played indoors.

Finnish League Cup Finals

Performance by club

Notes:
Teams in Italic no longer exist.

See also
 Finnish Cup

References

External links
Liigacup at Veikkausliiga site
Finland - League Cup Finals, RSSSF.com
Finnish League Cup, Soccerway

 
2
Finland
Veikkausliiga
Recurring sporting events established in 1994
1994 establishments in Finland
Recurring sporting events disestablished in 2016
2016 disestablishments in Finland